Ilyes Ziani (born 20 June 2003) is a Belgian professional footballer who plays for SL 16 FC (the second team of Standard Liège) on loan from Royale Union SG.

Club career 
Coming through the youth ranks of the Royale Union Saint-Gilloise, of which he captained the under-21 side, Ilyes Ziani signed his first professional contract with the club from the Belgian capital on in August 2021.

Ziani made his professional debut for Union SG on the 15 December 2021, replacing Dante Vanzeir during a 2–0 away Division 1A win against Zulte Waregem. The newly promoted team from Saint-Gilles was then enjoying a remarkable spell back in the First Division after 48 years, with Union sitting well on top of the league after the first half of the season.

References

External links

Royale Union Saint-Gilloise profile 

2003 births
Living people
Belgian footballers
Association football midfielders
Royale Union Saint-Gilloise players
Belgian Pro League players
Challenger Pro League players
Footballers from Brussels
Belgian sportspeople of Moroccan descent